The 2022–23 LEN Champions League Women is the 35th edition of the major competition for European women's water polo clubs. It starts on 17 November 2022.

Qualification round 
3 teams will progress from each group. The remaining 8 teams will compete in the LEN Euro Cup for women.

Group A (Pacos de Ferreira, Portugal) 
CN Mataro (ESP), Olympic Nice (FRA), Vouliagmeni NC (GRE), Pacence (POR, host team), ZVL 1886 (NED)

  ZVL 1886 28–7 Pacense 
  Vouliagmeni NC 14–4 Nice 
  Nice 5–10 ZVL 1886 
  CN Mataro 14–11 Vouliagmeni NC 
  Pacense 4–20 Nice 
  ZVL 1886 5–27 CN Mataro 
  CN Mataro 30–5 Pacense 
  Vouliagmeni NC 13–9 ZVL 1886 
  Nice 4–21 CN Mataro 
  Pacense 3–26 Vouliagmeni NC

Group B (Glyfada, Greece) 
NC Glyfada (GRE, host team), ZV De Zaan (NED), CN Terrassa (ESP), Grand Nancy (FRA), Tigre Eger (HUN)

  CN Terassa 11–11 ZV De Zaan 
  NC Glyfada 21–4 Grand Nancy 
  Grand Nancy 1–22 CN Terassa 
  Eger 15–10 ZV De Zaan 
  ZV De Zaan 12–11 NC Glyfada 
  Eger 14–13 CN Terassa 
  NC Glyfada 13–8 CN Terassa 
  Grand Nancy 4–13 Eger 
  ZV De Zaan 18–2 Grand Nancy 
  NC Glyfada 13–11 Eger

Group C (Barcelona, Spain) 
Plebiscito Padova (ITA), UA Lille (FRA), Sirens ASC Malta (MLT), FTC-Telekom Budapest (HUN), CE Mediterrani Barcelona (ESP, host)

  Plebiscito Padova 33–7 Sirens ASC Malta 
  CE Mediterrani 7–9 FTC-Telekom Budapest 
  UA Lille 8–18 FTC-Telekom Budapest 
  CE Mediterrani 31–7 Sirens ASC Malta 
  FTC-Telekom Budapest 33–4 Sirens ASC Malta 
  UA Lille 10–18 Plebiscito Padova 
  Plebiscito Padova 13–8 FTC-Telekom Budapest 
  CE Mediterrani 21–4 UA Lille 
  UA Lille 23–4 Sirens ASC Malta 
  CE Mediterrani 12–10 Plebiscito Padova

Group D (Mulhouse, France) 
Dunaujvarosi Foiskola (HUN), Spandau 04 Berlin (GER), SIS Roma (ITA), Ethnikos Piraeus (GRE), Mulhouse WP (FRA, host team)

  Mulhouse 19–12 Spandau 04 Berlin 
  Ethnikos Piraeus 10–16 SIS Roma 
  Ethnikos Piraeus 20–6 Spandau 04 Berlin 
  Mulhouse 11–14 Dunaujvarosi Foiskola 
  Spandau 04 Berlin 5–23 SIS Roma 
  Ethnikos Piraeus 8–13 Dunaujvarosi Foiskola 
  Dunaujvarosi Foiskola 10–15 SIS Roma 
  Mulhouse 10–15 Ethnikos Piraeus 
  Dunaujvarosi Foiskola 21–7 Spandau 04 Berlin 
  Mulhouse 4–21 SIS Roma

Last 16

Group A 
Ekipe Orizzonte (ITA), Plebiscito Padova (ITA) (Host), Dunaujvarosi Foiskola (HUN), ZVL 1886 (NED)

Group B 
Astralpool Sabadell (ESP), CN Mataro (ESP), Eger (HUN) (Host), FTC Telekom Budapest (HUN)

Group C 
UVSE (HUN) (Host), NC Glyfada (GRE), CE Mediterrani (ESP), Ethnikos Piraeus (GRE)

Group D 
Olympiacos Piraeus (GRE), SIS Roma (ITA) (Host), NC Vouliagmeni (GRE), ZV De Zaan (NED)

Quarterfinals 
Official source:

|}

1st leg (11/2/2023) 

  Olympiacos Piraeus 9–11 CN Mataro 
  CE Mediterrani 9–13 Dunaujvaros 
  NC Glyfada 13–14 Ekipe Orizzonte 
  Astralpool Sabadell 15–10 SIS Roma

2nd leg (25/2/2023) 

  CN Mataro 15–12 Olympiacos Piraeus 
  Dunaujvaros 9–8 CE Mediterrani 
  Ekipe Orizzonte 15–9 NC Glyfada 
  SIS Roma 13–10 Astralpool Sabadell

References 

2023 in water polo
LEN Euro League Women seasons
LEN